Desnuda is the 26th album and 21st studio album recorded by Puerto Rican singer Ednita Nazario. It was released on March 27, 2012.  The album follows the same musical and lyrical formula of her previous recordings with moderate success in terms of sales.

Track listing

Tour

Desnuda El Concierto (also referred to as Desnuda Tour) is the concert tour  by Ednita Nazario in support of her studio album Desnuda, produced by Angelo Medina. In her last musical production, Ednita began a journey of discovery what she shared with her fans all over the world. The album was particularly poignant since it was accompanied by moments of great happiness, becoming critical and sales success. Throughout the race Ednita prolific and diverse, she has won countless awards and recognitions, and excelled in many artistic endeavors.

Setlist

Tour dates

Festivals and other miscellaneous performances
 These concert is part of the "Feria Carnaval Turismo de Puerto Rico y el Caribe".
 These concert is part of the "Festival Artesanal Pedreño".
 These concert is part of the "OktoberFest 2012"
 These concert is part of a benefit gala for the Go-Gogo Foundation.
 These concert is part of the KQ Concert.

Cancellations and rescheduled shows

Box office score data

Charts

See also
 List of number-one Billboard Latin Albums from the 2010s

References

2012 albums
Ednita Nazario albums